Indolestes peregrinus is a species of spreadwing in the damselfly family Lestidae.

The IUCN conservation status of Indolestes peregrinus is "LC", least concern, with no immediate threat to the species' survival. The population is stable. The IUCN status was reviewed in 2009.

References

Further reading

 

Lestidae
Articles created by Qbugbot
Insects described in 1916